is a passenger railway station in the city of Kimitsu, Chiba Prefecture, Japan, operated by the East Japan Railway Company (JR East).

Lines
Kazusa-Kameyama Station is the eastern terminus of the Kururi Line, and is located 32.2 km from the opposing terminus of the line at Kisarazu Station.

Station layout
Kazusa-Kameyama Station has a single island platform serving a single bidirectional track. Only the far side of the platform is used, and the side facing the station building is fenced off. The platform is accessed by a level crossing over the track.

Gallery

History
The station opened on March 25, 1936. It was closed from December 16, 1944 to April 1, 1947. With the privatization of JNR on April 1, 1987, the station came under the control of JR East.

Passenger statistics
In fiscal 2010, the station was used by an average of 90 passengers daily (boarding passengers only).

Bus routes
Kameyama-Fujibayashioohashi bus stop
Kapina 
For Awa-Kamogawa Station 
For Chiba-Chuo Station
Kapina is operated by Chiba Chuo Bus and Nitto Kotsu
Aqusea 
For Awa-Kamogawa Station
For Tokyo Station
Aqusea is operated by Keisei Bus and Nitto Kotsu

Surrounding area

 
 Kameyama Dam
 Kameyama Onsen

See also
 List of railway stations in Japan

References

External links

 JR East Station information 

Kururi Line
Stations of East Japan Railway Company
Railway stations in Chiba Prefecture
Railway stations in Japan opened in 1936
Kimitsu